Llameros run llama caravans throughout the Andes of South America.  In ancient times, llamero was a high-ranking position that involved both managing the emperor's llama and alpaca herds, and maintaining trade and communication throughout the empire.  Nowadays, roads have reduced the need for llameros, but llameros are still very important in more inaccessible mountain villages.

References

Animal-powered vehicles
Transport in Peru